The Battle of Carthage was fought in 698 between a Roman expeditionary force and the armies of the Umayyad Caliphate.

Background
Having lost Carthage to the Muslims in 695, Emperor Leontius sent the navy under the command of John the Patrician and the droungarios Tiberius Apsimarus. They entered the harbour and successfully recaptured it in a surprise attack in 697, which resulted in the city's Arab forces fleeing to Kairouan.

Preparation
Emir Hasan ibn al-Nu'man was in the middle of a campaign in the Greater Maghreb region but withdrew from campaigning in the field to confront the renewed Roman challenge to the emerging caliphate. He drew plans at Kairouan to retake Carthage the following spring. It is estimated that he headed a force of 40,000 men. The Romans sent out a call for help to their allies, the native Berbers, and to enemies the Visigoths and the Franks. Despite the king of the Visigoths, Wittiza, sending a force of 500 warriors to help defend Carthage, the Romans were in disarray because of infighting and were sapped of much of their strength.

Battle
Hasan ibn al-Nu'man, enraged at having to retake a city that had not resisted the Roman takeover, offered no terms except to surrender or die. Emperor Leontius had also given his forces instructions of victory or death. The Romans left Carthage and attacked the Emir's army directly but were defeated, and the Roman commander decided to wait out the siege behind the walls of Carthage to let the Arabs exhaust themselves, as he could continue to be resupplied from the sea. The defenders were faced with Hasan's overwhelming force deployed in ferocious attacks as his men made repeated attempts to scale the walls with ladders. They combined the land assault with an attack from the sea that caused the Roman commanders to withdraw from the city, and subsequently resulted in the second and final great destruction of Carthage. The Romans retreated to the islands of Corsica, Sicily and Crete to resist further Muslim expansion. The battle marked the definitive end of Roman Africa.

Aftermath 

John the Patrician was later murdered after a conspiracy at the hands of his co-commander, Tiberius Apsimarus. Instead of returning to Africa to fight the Muslims, Tiberius Apsimarus sailed instead to Constantinople. After a successful rebellion, he rose to the throne as Tiberius III, and was later deposed by former emperor Justinian II, now known as the Rhinotmetus.

The conquest of North Africa by the forces of Islam was now nearly complete. Hasan's forces met with resistance from the Zenata tribe of Berbers under al-Kahina, who inflicted a serious defeat on him and drove him back to Barqa. However, in 702 he received strong reinforcement from Caliph Abd al-Malik. He then developed the village of Tunis,  from the destroyed Carthage.

References

Carthage (698)
Carthage (698)
698
Carthage 698
690s in the Byzantine Empire
Carthage
Carthage
Muslim conquest of the Maghreb
690s in the Umayyad Caliphate
Archdiocese of Carthage